Glenn Travelle Wharton (born May 19, 1981) is an American football coach and former offensive lineman who is the assistant offensive line coach for the Washington Commanders of the National Football League (NFL). He played college football at the University of South Carolina and was drafted by the Carolina Panthers in the third round of the 2004 NFL Draft. He also played for the Cincinnati Bengals.

Early years
Wharton was a Shrine Bowl participant following his senior year at Hillcrest High School in Simpsonville, South Carolina He earned all-area and all-state recognition as a senior.

College career
Travelle Wharton started 45 of the 47 games he played at left tackle for the University of South Carolina. He did not allow a sack after the second game of his freshman season in 2000, a span of 45 contests. In 2003, as a senior, he started all 12 games at left tackle. Wharton earned second-team All-Southeastern Conference recognition and was chosen to play in the Senior Bowl. He was a team captain and was the lone returning starter on the offensive line that allowed only 10 sacks the entire season.

Professional career

Carolina Panthers
He started the final 11 games at left guard as a rookie in 2004 after being inactive for the first five contests. He was the lone rookie starter on the offensive line in 2004 that yielded only 33 sacks, the third-lowest total in Carolina history.

He started all 16 games during the 2005 season.

In the first game of the 2006 season during a 20-6 loss to the Atlanta Falcons he suffered a torn ACL and MCL and was placed on injured reserve thus ending his season.

He returned to start all 16 games at left tackle during the 2007 campaign.

Before the 2008 season, on February 14, 2008, Wharton signed a 6-year extension to remain with the Panthers. The deal had a total dollar value of $36 million and included $12 million dollars in guaranteed money.
Travelle went on to start all 14 games he appeared in during the 2008 season at left guard, missing two due to injury. He was released on March 13, 2012.

Cincinnati Bengals
Wharton signed with Cincinnati Bengals on March 17, 2012. He was placed on injured reserve on August 24, 2012, after suffering a knee injury. He was released by the Bengals on July 22, 2013.

Second stint with Panthers
On August 25, 2013, Wharton signed a one-year deal with the Carolina Panthers. Wharton announced his retirement on July 29, 2014.

Coaching career
Wharton was the offensive line coach for South Carolina during their 2015 season.

On January 29, 2018, the Carolina Panthers signed Wharton to be their offensive line coach. In 2020, he joined the Washington Football Team as their assistant offensive line coach. This move reunited Wharton with newly hired head coach Ron Rivera, who he worked under with the Panthers.

Personal life
Wharton is married with three daughters and a son.

References

External links

Washington Commanders bio

1981 births
Living people
Sportspeople from Greenville, South Carolina
Players of American football from South Carolina
American football offensive guards
American football offensive tackles
South Carolina Gamecocks football players
Carolina Panthers players
Cincinnati Bengals players
Carolina Panthers coaches
Washington Commanders coaches
Washington Football Team coaches